Gena the Crocodile is a fictional friendly crocodile in the series of animation films Gena the Crocodile, Cheburashka and Shapoklyak by Roman Kachanov (Soyuzmultfilm studio). He debuted in the 1966 novel Gena the Crocodile and His Friends (ru) by Eduard Uspensky. The crocodile's name is a typical diminutive of the Russian male name Gennady. Gena and Cheburashka, also a title character in the series, are best friends.

The 50-year-old Gena works in a zoo as an attraction (or, as the original novel's author Uspensky had put it, "Gena the Crocodile worked in a zoo as a crocodile"). In his spare time, he plays the garmon and likes to sing. His two best-known songs are "Pust' begut neuklyuzhe..." and "Goluboy vagon" ("The Blue Train Car").

One rainy day, which happens to be his birthday, Gena sings the song: "Let the pedestrians run clumsily over puddles..." ("Пусть бегут неуклюже пешеходы по лужам..."), which contains the famous line: "Such a pity that one's birthday happens only once a year." This song, written by Vladimir Shainsky, has since become known as "Gena the Crocodile's Song". It continues to be extremely popular among Russophones of various ages and generations, and was also made popular in Finland by M. A. Numminen as "Minä soitan harmonikkaa" ("I Play the Accordion").

He is voiced by Vasily Livanov in the animated films.

The Mikoyan MiG-27 aircraft was given the nickname Крокодил Гена due to the distinctive shape of its nosecone.

External Links 

 Gena the Crocodile’s Song in English

References

Animated characters
Characters in children's literature
Literary characters introduced in 1966
Fictional crocodilians